Piddletrenthide is a village and civil parish in the English county of Dorset. In the 2011 census the parish—which includes the small village of Plush to the northeast—had 323 dwellings, 290 households and a population of 647.

Toponymy
The unusual name of the village is derived from its position on the River Piddle, combined with it having been assessed for thirty hides in the Domesday Book. The name sometimes prompts amusement and discussion, and references have been made to it in the TV Times (25 April-1 May 1970), The Times (a lengthy correspondence in 1974, then again on 27 March 1999), The Sunday Times ( 22 December 2002 and 25 September 2005), and The Guardian (8 May 2004).

History
In 1086 in the Domesday Book Piddletrenthide was recorded as Pidrie; it had 70 households, 17 ploughlands,  of meadow, three mills and a taxable value of 30 geld units. It was in Cerne, Totcombe and Modbury Hundred and the tenant-in-chief was Winchester Abbey. The manor's estate was one of the largest in the county.

A Benedictine cell (i.e., a very small monastic establishment) existed here in the Middle Ages. Its date of foundation is unknown. It was dissolved in 1354, and its chapel demolished shortly after 1382. There are no physical remains and its location within the parish is unknown.

Piddletrenthide's common arable fields were enclosed by Act of Parliament in 1817.

All Saints parish church

All Saints parish church, situated on the northern edge of the village, has a claim to being one of the finest village churches in Dorset. The south doorway and piers of the chancel arch are Norman; the doorway inside the porch features typically Norman zigzag decoration. The tower dates from 1485 and has twin-light bell openings, numerous pinnacles and gargoyles. The nave and aisles are also 15th-century. Over the west door of the church-tower is the Latin inscription:
"Est pydeltrenth villa in dorsedie comitatu Nascitur in illa quam rexit Vicariatu 1487". The inscription translates as: "It is in Piddletrenthide, a town in Dorset [where] he was born [and] is Vicar, 1487." As the vicar in that year was Nicholas Locke, presumably the tower was dedicated to him. This is an early use of Arabic numerals in England at a time when the use of Roman numerals continued for another century elsewhere in England.

In 1852 the building was restored and the walls raised by John Hicks, the brother of the incumbent vicar. Hicks went on to restore and build more than 27 churches in the county. The chancel, by Ewan Christian, is from 1880. The church also has some excellent Victorian memorials. In the churchyard, to the south east side of the chancel, are two semi-circular headstones marking the graves of members of the Durbefield family. The family was immortalised by Thomas Hardy in his 1891 Tess of the d'Urbervilles.

The church is part of the benefice of the Piddle Valley, Hilton, Cheselbourne and Melcombe Horsey.  From July 2015 the benefice enters a clerical vacancy.

Geography
The parish comprises two distinct settlements: Piddletrenthide village in the valley of the River Piddle, and the smaller Plush in a side valley to the northeast. Piddletrenthide village is divided into three tithings: Higher, Middle and Lower. The church and manor house is the higher tithing, a group of cottages form the middle, and the third is known as White Lackington, which is a little separate from the other parts and is close to neighbouring Piddlehinton.
  
At the northern end of the village, reached by a footpath from the Poachers Inn, is Morning Well (or Mourning Well), where several springs feed into the River Piddle. In his book Portrait of Dorset Ralph Wightman described it as where "springs bubble out of the base of a steep wooded hill into a shady pool....It is an enchanted place, raising memories of holy wells and pagan groves."

Culture, art and media
Scrumpy and Western artist Trevor Crozier wrote a song entitled "The Piddletrenthide Jug Band" for Dorset folk group The Yetties.

Piddletrenthide was also featured as the hometown of Jem Kellaway, one of the main protagonists in Tracy Chevalier's 18th-century-set novel Burning Bright.

In the 21st century the tenor John Hudson, formerly a principal with English National Opera, has performed in a series of annual concerts at All Saints parish church, with support provided by other musicians with local connections.

Notable residents
The BBC Radio broadcaster Ralph Wightman (1901–1971), English lecturer, journalist, author, and radio and television broadcaster, came from here. Wightman was the model for Kenneth Williams' country character Arthur Fallowfield and was noted in his radio broadcasts for his fine Dorset accent.

See also
 Piddletrenthide Hoard

References

Notes

General references

External links

Villages in Dorset